Denetiah Provincial Park and Protected Area is a provincial park and protected area located in the northern interior of British Columbia, Canada. It was established on June 29, 1999 to protect a large area of pristine wilderness at the headwaters of the Denetiah and Dahl Rivers.

Geography
Denetiah Provincial Park is composed of a 97,908 hectare Class A Park unit and a 7,441 hectare protected area unit. The provincial park is part of the larger Muskwa-Kechika Management Area, which aims to coordinate the management of Denetiah Provincial Park with 14 other provincial parks and protected areas located in the region.

See also
Dall River Old Growth Provincial Park

References

Provincial parks of British Columbia
Liard Country
Cassiar Mountains
1999 establishments in British Columbia
Protected areas established in 1999